Mount Cameron is a  mountain summit located in the Chugach Mountains, in the U.S. state of Alaska. Although modest in elevation, relief is significant since the southern aspect of the mountain rises up from the tidewater of Prince William Sound's Shoup Bay in approximately 4.4 miles. The mountain takes its name from local prospectors as reported in 1912 by the U.S. Geological Survey.

Climate

Based on the Köppen climate classification, Mount Cameron is located in a subarctic climate zone with long, cold, snowy winters, and mild summers. Weather systems coming off the Gulf of Alaska are forced upwards by the Chugach Mountains (orographic lift), causing heavy precipitation in the form of rainfall and snowfall. Temperatures can drop below −20 °C with wind chill factors below −30 °C. This climate supports the Shoup Glacier on the east aspect, and immense Columbia Glacier to the west.

See also

List of mountain peaks of Alaska
Geography of Alaska

References

External links
 Weather forecast: Mount Cameron
 Flickr photo: Mt. Cameron upper left corner

Landforms of Chugach Census Area, Alaska
Mountains of Alaska
North American 1000 m summits